Gabdrakhman Kadyrov (1941-1993) was an international speedway rider from the Soviet Union. His nationality was described as being a Tatar and his mother came from Bashkortostan but he was born in Shatura.

Speedway career 
Kadyrov was one of the all-time great Ice Speedway riders. He won the inaugural Individual Ice Speedway World Championship in 1966 and went on to be the champion of the world six times in total, after winning again in 1966, 1968, 1969, 1971, 1972 and 1973.

He won a silver medal at the Speedway World Team Cup in the 1967 Speedway World Team Cup. He was known as Gab and earned the nickname 'The Beatle' by his fellow Soviet riders because of his hair cut resembling The Beatles at the time. He was a metal craftsman by trade.

World final appearances

Individual Ice World Championship
 1966 -  2 rounds - 1st - 43pts
 1967 -  3 rounds - 5th - 39pts
 1968 -  2 rounds - 1st - 54pts
 1969 -  Inzell - 1st - 14pts
 1970 -  Nässjö - 2nd - 14pts
 1971 -  Inzell - 1st - 29pts
 1972 -  Nässjö - 1st - 15pts
 1973 -  Inzell - 1st - 29pts
 1974 -  Nässjö - 3rd - 13pts

World Team Cup
 1967 -  Malmö, Malmö Stadion (with Igor Plekhanov / Boris Samorodov / Viktor Trofimov / Farid Szajnurov) - 3rd= - 19pts (2)

References 

1941 births
Russian speedway riders
1993 deaths
Sportspeople from Moscow Oblast